Star Circle Quest (season 2) premiered on October 11, 2004 on ABS-CBN. Hosts Luis Manzano and Jodi Sta. Maria and jury members Boy Abunda, Gloria Diaz and Laurenti Dyogi reprised their roles for the second season.

Contestants

Stars of Luzon
Alener-Joe Sotelo
Arron Villaflor
Haz Ismail
Alexander Sazon
Janelle Manahan (later Janelle Quintana)
Reynan Pitero
Chretien Kevin Iporac
Edizon Villegas

Stars of Visayas
Mark Pertgen
Bryan Villarosa
Vanessa "Vane" Grindrud
Sciatzy Toepe
Ken Tiangha
Camille Vallesar
Jack Umali
Christopher Vistal
Sien Aquino
Pamela Lizares
Rogel Sombrero
Ralf Valdizno

Stars of Mindanao
Charles Christianson
Ericka Christelle Gancayco (later Erich Gonzales)
Gwend Villanueva
Ray-an Zurbano
Ryan R. Torres
Jayson Villar
Mario Renze Ibardaloza
Fernando Divina (Ron Allan Divina)

Stars of NCR
 Geraldine 'Marla' Boyd
OJ Decena
Amparo 'Paw' Diaz, 17
Nica Escandor
Bebs and KC Hollman, 14
Denmark 'DM' Sevilla 17 (DM Sevilla)
Marvs Luna
Ian Christian Altura
Erl Sindrae Benavidez
Emmanuel Amantillo
Joanna Sandra Falcis
Francis Charles Brines
Joyce Pacis

Stars of USA
Michelle Arciaga
Sherwin Santos
Theo Bernados
Andrei Banta
Peejay "Mapagmahal" Mandid
Victor Velarde
Mark Angelo Dellosa
Ren Joshua Ramirez
Melvin Bautista
Mel Brillo
Jim Olbes
Adrian Verzola

Grand Questors Night
The Grand Questors Night was hosted at the PhilSports Arena. The Magic Circle of 5 showcased their talents through individual performances. Erich Gonzales became the Grand Questor, Arron Villaflor was in the second, Paw Diaz in third, Charles Christianson in fourth, and DM Sevilla in fifth place.

Elimination chart

: Jason and Paw have a tie score with 8.29 that's why the judges decided to have a showdown with acting and dancing. Paw got 8.93 then Jason got 7.66 that's why Paw became the winner.Part of the Top 3 in votes were: Paw, Jason and Vanessa
: Due to the Wildcard Twist, there are technically two number 8's.

External links
 Star Circle Quest Official Website
 The Star Circle Quest Community

References

 
2004 Philippine television seasons
2005 Philippine television seasons